George Watson may refer to:

Politicians
 George Watson (mayor) (1852–1923), mayor of Brisbane
 George Watson (MP) (1768–1824), MP for Canterbury
 George Harvey Watson (1879–1947), politician in Saskatchewan, Canada

Sportsmen
 George Watson (Australian rules footballer) (1922–1978), Australian rules footballer for Fitzroy
 George Watson (baseball) (1881–?), American baseball player
 George Watson (bowls), Irish lawn bowls player
 George Watson (cricketer, born 1855) (1855–1884), New Zealand cricketer
 George Watson (cricketer, born 1907) (1907–1974), Kent CCC cricketer
 George Watson (cyclist) (1891–1938), Canadian Olympic cyclist
 George Watson (footballer, born 1905) (1905–1991), English football goalkeeper
 George Watson (rugby) (1885–1961), Australian rugby footballer
 George Watson (umpire), Australian Test cricket umpire

Artists
 George Watson (painter) (1767–1837), Scottish painter
 George Spencer Watson (1869–1934), English portrait artist

Military
 George Watson (Medal of Honor) (1915–1943), US soldier awarded the Medal of Honor in 1997 for actions during World War II
 George Watson (Royal Navy officer) (1827–1897), British Admiral
 George Watson (United States Army Air Corps) (1920–2017), supply sergeant and support personnel for the Tuskegee Airmen
 George Lennox Watson (1851–1904), Scottish naval architect

Others
 George Watson (accountant) (1654–1723), Scottish accountant and the founder of George Watson's College in Edinburgh
 George Watson (scholar) (1927–2013), Fellow at St. John's College, Cambridge University
 George Earl Watson (1897–1975), American educator
 George Leo Watson (1909–1988), English mathematician
 George Mackie Watson (1860–1948), Scottish architect
 G. N. Watson (1886–1965), English mathematician
 George Whyte-Watson (1908–1974), Scottish surgeon

See also 
 George Watson's College, a co-educational independent day school in Scotland
 George Watson-Taylor (1771–1841), MP